Miniature is a musical composition in five movements composed in 1948 by American composer William Grant Still. The composition was originally created for trio (flute, oboe, and piano) and was later, in 1963, arranged for quintet (flute, oboe, bassoon, clarinet and horn). The composition is about twelve minutes long.

Overview
The work was dedicated to Sir John and Lady Barbirolli: “This suite is based on folk songs of the Americas, and is a souvenir of the visit to America of Sir John and Lady Barbirolli, and of the many friends made by them during their stay.”

According to the Staff of the International Opus, the composition is well described as follows:

Movements
The work is in five movements as follows:

See also
 List of jazz-influenced classical compositions

References

Further reading

External links
 
 
 Miniatures (The Wind Repertory Project)

Compositions by William Grant Still
1948 compositions